Any Gabrielly Rolim Soares is a Brazilian singer, actress, songwriter, voice actress, model, musician, composer and dancer. She is best known for voicing Moana in the Brazilian dub of the 2016 film Moana. Any was also a former member of the global pop group Now United, representing Brazil. She is now a solo artist managed by Simon Fuller.

Early life
Any Gabrielly was just six years old when she hummed her first notes, between one game and another, drawing the attention of her family. The operas that her grandfather liked to listen to were an invitation for Any to have her interest in art awakened, finally looking for studies that would introduce her to singing, dancing and acting.

Career
Gabrielly's singing talent was first noticed by her family at the age of six, especially by her aunt Laura Carolina, a judge on the Brazilian reality show Canta Comigo.

At the age of eight, Gabrielly attended the São Paulo Municipal Ballet School, performing at the Grande Otelo, Cacilda Becker and Teatro Municipal theaters.

2013–2015: Debut in Broadway musical and first works on TV 
At the age of nine, Gabrielly was chosen to be one of the young Nalas in the São Paulo staging of The Lion King. The production had a long audition process divided into five stages, added to a 15-day workshop, from which Any came out approved and willing to live a new routine, which would involve three months of rehearsals from Monday to Saturday and, after the debut, a long season of presentations twice a week.

In 2015, Gabrielly recorded the series Buuu - A Call to Adventure, playing the nerd Chica.

2016–present: Moana, Now United and MPN 
After auditioning in July 2016, Gabrielly debuted as a voice actress in the Brazilian version of the animation Moana, dubbing the title character and the first Polynesian Disney Princess, Moana Waialiki. The film had Any recording some songs, including the local version of "How Far I'll Go", "Saber Quem Sou". She followed it by dubbing Jade Alleyne's character Kaylee in the Brazilian version of The Lodge.

On November 14, 2017, Gabrielly's name was revealed as one of the members of the global pop group Now United, being the sixth until then. In December of the same year, the group Now United released their first single, "Summer in the City". In June 2019, the music video for "Paraná" was released by Now United, where Any stands out. And in September of the same year the song "Legends" was released on digital platforms, where Any is also the most prominent, the song has a Portuguese version called "Lendas", released in November 2019 on the eve of Now United's Dreams Come True Tour.

On August 19, 2020, Gabrielly was introduced as one of the hosts of 2020 Nickelodeon Meus Prêmios Nick, being the first black host in the history of Meus Prêmios Nick.

On September 22, 2022, Gabrielly announced in an interview with Rolling Stone, her departure from the musical group Now United to pursue a solo career.

Personal life
Gabrielly has a younger half-sister called Isabelli, born in 2010, and a younger half-brother named Guilherme. She is of Afro-Brazilian origin and speaks English, Portuguese and Spanish. But she has sung in several different languages, including French, Tagalog, Arabic, Italian, Korean, Spanish, English and Portuguese.

Filmography

Films

Television

Internet

Theater

Discography

Now United

Single

Soundtracks

Awards and nominations

With Now United 

At just 17 years old, Any Gabrielly is the first Brazilian in history to be identified at MTV's VMA (Video Music Awards). She competed for the Best Group award with Now United.

References

External links 
 
 

2002 births
Afro-Brazilian actresses
Afro-Brazilian female dancers
Afro-Brazilian women singers
Brazilian female dancers
21st-century Brazilian women singers
21st-century Brazilian singers
Brazilian television actresses
Brazilian voice actresses
Living people
Now United members
People from Guarulhos
XIX Entertainment artists